Wali Tangi Dam is a small dam in the Urak Valley in Balochistan province of Pakistan. It is situated approximately 20 km east of Quetta at an elevation of approximately 8,350 ft.

Wali Tangi Dam was constructed by the Pakistan Army in the early 1960s with the purpose of supplying clean water to the Urak Valley and Quetta for irrigation and human consumption. The dam stores and utilizes fresh water from melting snows in the surrounding Zarghoon Hills, which are part of the Sulaiman Range.

See also 
 List of dams and reservoirs in Pakistan

Sources 
 Pervaiz Iqbal Cheema, "The Armed Forces of Pakistan", Allen & Unwin, 2002
 Raymond A. Moore, Jr., "The Use of the Army in Nation-Building: The Case of Pakistan", Asian Survey, Vol. 9, No. 6 (Jun., 1969), pp. 447–456

References 

Dams in Balochistan, Pakistan